Sir Alexander Lindsay of Evelick, 3rd Baronet (11 May 1683, Dunfermline – 6 May 1762, Evelix) was a Scottish baronet from the Lindsay of Evelick family.  He married into Clan Murray by his marriage with Amelia Murray, daughter of David Murray, 5th Viscount Stormont and sister of William Murray, 1st Earl of Mansfield.  They had four children:

Sir David Lindsay of Evelick, who succeeded Alexander.
Sir John Lindsay, Royal Navy admiral and father of Dido Elizabeth Belle.
Margaret Lindsay, who became the wife of the painter Allan Ramsay.
Katherine Lindsay who married Alexander Murray, Lord Henderland

References

External links 
 http://www.perthshireheritage.co.uk/evelick.html 

1683 births
1762 deaths
People from Perth and Kinross
History of Perth and Kinross
Alexander
Baronets in the Baronetage of Nova Scotia